A trysail (also known as a spencer) is a small triangular or gaff rigged sail hoisted in place of a larger mainsail when winds are very high.  The trysail provides enough thrust to maintain control of the ship, e.g. to avoid ship damage, and to keep the bow to the wind.  It is hoisted abaft (i.e., directly behind) the mainmast (taking the place of the much larger mainsail) or, on a brig, abaft the foremast.  A trysail is analogous to a storm jib.

Royal Navy usage

In the Royal Navy in the late nineteenth century, the term 'trysail' came to denote the main fore-and-aft sail on any mast.  This included the mainsail of the 'great brig' HMS Temeraire, the largest fore-and-aft sail ever used by a warship.  Naval trysails were usually gaff-rigged and 'loose-footed', with a spar along the head but no boom, and small auxiliary trysails continued in intermittent use into the 1920s for seakeeping and station-keeping.

Sources

References

Sailing rigs and rigging